Sun Zhifeng (born July 17, 1991 in Changchun) is a snowboarder who competes in Half-pipe. She has two World Cup victories and competed at the 2006 Winter Olympics. Sun competed for China at the 2010 Winter Olympics in women's Half-pipe.

References 

Olympic snowboarders of China
Chinese female snowboarders
Snowboarders at the 2006 Winter Olympics
Snowboarders at the 2010 Winter Olympics
Snowboarders at the 2014 Winter Olympics
1991 births
Living people
Sportspeople from Changchun
Snowboarders at the 2007 Asian Winter Games
Universiade medalists in snowboarding
Universiade silver medalists for China
Competitors at the 2013 Winter Universiade
21st-century Chinese women